Qingxisan Road is a metro station on Line 8 of the Hangzhou Metro in China. It was opened on 28 June 2021, together with the Line 8. It is located in the Qiantang District of Hangzhou.

References 

Hangzhou Metro stations
2021 establishments in China